Harry Wasylyk Sr. (November 1904 - Sept, 1995) was a Canadian inventor from Winnipeg, Manitoba, who together with Larry Hansen of Lindsay, Ontario, invented the disposable polyethylene garbage bag in 1950. Garbage bags were first intended for commercial use rather than home use – the bags were first sold to the Winnipeg General Hospital. However, Hansen worked for the Union Carbide Company in Lindsay, which bought the invention from Wasylyk and Hansen. Union Carbide manufactured the first green garbage bags, marketed under the name Glad garbage bags for home use in the late 1960s.

External links and sources 

 Who Invented the Green Garbage Bag?
 Memorable Manitobans: Harry Wasylyk

1904 births
1995 deaths
Canadian inventors